Gordon Tamblyn (23 April 1918 – 31 December 2001) was an Australian cricketer. He played 21 first-class cricket matches for Victoria between 1939 and 1947.

See also
 List of Victoria first-class cricketers

References

External links
 

1918 births
2001 deaths
Australian cricketers
Victoria cricketers